Zarnan (also Romanized as Zarnān; also known as Gol Bāgh, Zaran, and Zarlān) is a village in Bonab Rural District, in the Central District of Zanjan County, Zanjan Province, Iran. At the 2006 census, its population was 321, in 72 families.

Among the prominent personalities of the village are Meysam Nassiri, a wrestler of the Iranian national wrestling team, Hajj Abdullah Hasani, and Haj Mansur Hasani and Karbala'i Majid Hasani.

Local competitions such as wrestling and horse riding are held every year in the village, attracting enthusiasts from around the city of Zanjan.

The Dushan Mountain and Zaranan Castle are also located in this area.

References 

Populated places in Zanjan County